The K class are a class of diesel locomotives built by English Electric, Rocklea for the Western Australian Government Railways between 1966 and 1969.

History

Nine K class were delivered in 1966/67 to operate services on the  Eastern Goldfields Railway from Perth to Kalgoorlie that was being converted to standard gauge. After initially working construction trains, in November 1966 they began working wheat trains from Merredin to Fremantle and once the full line was opened began working services to Kalgoorlie and Esperance.

In January 1966, K201 became the first locomotive to travel across Australia. It hauled freight trains from Brisbane to Melbourne, before being hauled for the rest of the journey. It passed through five states, travelled on six railway systems and required a change of bogies at Melbourne, Port Pirie and Kalgoorlie.

Goldsworthy Mining Ltd had purchased six similar locomotives, and after having one destroyed in an accident, purchased K202 with K210 ordered as a replacement. In July 1986 Goldsworth Mining purchased K203.

The Western Australian Government Railways also purchased 16 similar R class locomotives mounted on narrow gauge bogies. In 1974 three were fitted with standard gauge bogies and reclassified as the Ka class.

Four have been sold to SCT Logistics and three had gone to South Spur Rail Services by August 2000. The latter three are now owned by Greentrains and have been used as Broken Hill shunters as well as in Western Australia.

The two sold to Goldsworthy Mining were transferred to BHP's Port Kembla operation in November 1992.

Class List (K)

References

BHP Billiton diesel locomotives
Co-Co locomotives
English Electric locomotives
Diesel locomotives of Western Australia
Railway locomotives introduced in 1966
Standard gauge locomotives of Australia
Diesel-electric locomotives of Australia